Secure operating system may refer to:
Security-focused operating system
Security-evaluated operating system, operating systems that have achieved certification from an external security-auditing organization
Trusted operating system, an operating system that provides sufficient support for multilevel security and evidence of correctness to meet a particular set of requirements

Operating system security